Scratch dermatitis is a cutaneous condition characterized by linear hyperpigmented streaks are seen on the chest and back.

See also 
 Bleomycin
 List of cutaneous conditions

References

Further reading

Disturbances of human pigmentation